Blackhall Colliery Welfare F.C. was an English association football club which participated in the Wearside Football League and the FA Cup.

References

External links
My Matchday - 434 Blackhall Colliery Welfare at 100groundsclub.blogspot.co.uk

1939 establishments in England
1992 disestablishments in England
Association football clubs established in 1939
Defunct football clubs in England
Association football clubs disestablished in 1992
North Eastern League
Mining association football teams in England
Defunct football clubs in Tyne and Wear